Shenzhen Bay Innovation and Technology Centre is a group of skyscrapers in Shenzhen, Guangdong, China. Construction on tower 1 began in 2015 and the building was completed in 2020.

See also

List of tallest buildings in Shenzhen
List of tallest buildings in China

References

Skyscraper office buildings in Shenzhen
Skyscrapers in Shenzhen